Tina Enghoff (born 1957) is a Danish photographer, video artist, and writer who graduated from the International Center of Photography (ICP), New York.

Projects
Possible Relatives: Photos taken in the flats of people who have died in their homes between the 1920s-1960s but whose body have only been discovered between June 2002 to July 2003. In the newspaper, most receive an obituary that reads, "Man/Woman deceased. Any possible relatives are asked to contact... as soon as possible."
Dogwalk: A photo project where Enghoff walked everyday from November 1, 2006 – October 31, 2007 from Copenhagen Central Station to Heaven Express, a homeless shelter, and took pictures. On days she couldn't go, her friends went and collected objects which she photographed later.
Migrant Documents: A photo project concerning the harassment faced by undocumented immigrants at national borders.
Seven Years: Photos of seven anonymous women from the Middle East, Eastern Europe, Asia and Africa who are more susceptible to discrimination and harassment in the Danish social system due to their status as non-western females.
The Passages/Stills: A series of still lives that deal with an "invisible group of solitaries and rejects"

Awards
1997 Layout and design for best photo book in Sweden
1998 Layout and design for best photo book in Sweden
2000 Hasselbladfoundation, Sverige Prize
2003 Grant from the Politikken-Fonden, DK
2004 Nominated for The Deutsche Börse Photography Prize
2005 Fogtdals Travel Award, Copenhagen Denmark
2009 Layout and design for best photo book in Sweden
2010 Nominated for The Deutsche Börse Photography Prize

Books
1999 Fra en Tid, Rhodos, Denmark
1999 Out of a Time, Journal, Sweden
2003 "Eventuelle Pårøende," Tiderne Skifter, Copenhagen
2004 Possible Relatives, Journal, Sweden
2008 Dogwalk, Journal, Sweden
2010 Syv, Vandkunsten, Denmark
2010 Seven Years, Journal, Sweden
2013 Migrant Documents, Journal, Sweden/Vandkunsten, Denmark

References

1957 births
20th-century Danish photographers
21st-century Danish photographers
Danish photographers
Living people
Danish women photographers
20th-century women photographers
21st-century women photographers